Sayed Abdullah is an Afghan cricketer who plays for Kabul Eagles. He made his Twenty20 debut for Kabul Eagles in the 2017 Shpageeza Cricket League on 16 September 2017. In his second match, he took two wickets for eight runs in three overs, the best bowling figures in the match, which knocked Boost Defenders out of the competition.

References

External links
 

Year of birth missing (living people)
Living people
Afghan cricketers
Place of birth missing (living people)